Korna may refer to:
 Korna (Lycaonia), town of ancient Lycaonia, now in Turkey
 The Korňa village and municipality in Čadca District in the Žilina Region of northern Slovakia
 al-Qurnah, a city in Iraq